The Mythopoeic Awards for literature and literary studies are given annually for outstanding works in the fields of myth, fantasy, and the scholarly study of these areas. 
Established by the Mythopoeic Society in 1971, the Mythopoeic Fantasy Award is given for "fiction in the spirit of the Inklings", and the Scholarship Award for non-fiction work. The award is a statuette of a seated lion, with a plaque on the base. It has drawn resemblance to, and is often called, the "Aslan".

The Mythopoeic Award is one of the "principal annual awards" for fantasy according to critic Brian Stableford. From 1971 to 1991, there was one award per category, annual but not always awarded before 1981. Dual awards in each category were established in 1992: Mythopoeic Fantasy Awards for Adult Literature and Children's Literature; Scholarship Awards in Inklings Studies, and Myth and Fantasy Studies. In 2010, a Student Paper Award was introduced for the best paper presented at Mythcon by an undergraduate or graduate student; it was renamed the Alexei Kondratiev Award several months after its creation.

The 2022 winners were announced at Mythcon 52 in Albuquerque, New Mexico.

Mythopoeic Fantasy Awards 

In the following tables, the years correspond to the date of the ceremony, rather than when the novel was first published. Each year links to the corresponding "year in literature". Entries with a blue background and an asterisk (*) next to the writer's name have won the award; those with a white background are the other nominees on the shortlist.

  *   Winners

Fantasy (1971–1991)

1970s

1980s

1990s

Adult Literature

1990s

2000s

2010s

2020s

Children's Literature

1990s

2000s

2010s

2020s

Multiple wins and nominations 

The following authors have received two or more Mythopoeic Fantasy Awards.

The following authors have received four or more nominations.

Mythopoeic Scholarship Awards 
There are two Mythopoeic Scholarship Awards since 1992 (and a Student Paper Award related to Mythcon, not covered here, since 2010). The Scholarship Award in Inklings Studies dates from 1971, in effect, its name was expanded in 1992.

Scholarly works have three years to win the award once and may be on the final ballot three times.

Inklings Studies 
Winners are listed below.
 1971 – C. S. Kilby; Mary McDermott Shideler
 1972 – Walter Hooper
 1973 – Master of Middle-earth by Paul H. Kocher
 1974 – C. S. Lewis, Mere Christian by Kathryn Lindskoog
 1975 – C. S. Lewis: A Biography by Roger Lancelyn Green and Walter Hooper
 1976 – Tolkien Criticism by Richard C. West; C. S. Lewis, An Annotated Checklist by Joe R. Christopher and Joan K. Ostling; Charles W. S. Williams, A Checklist by Lois Glenn
 1981 – Christopher Tolkien
 1982 – The Inklings by Humphrey Carpenter
 1983 – Companion to Narnia by Paul F. Ford
 1984 – The Road to Middle-earth by T. A. Shippey
 1985 – Reason and Imagination in C. S. Lewis by Peter J. Schakel
 1986 – Charles Williams, Poet of Theology by Glen Cavaliero
 1987 – J. R. R. Tolkien: Myth, Morality and Religion by Richard Purtill
 1988 – C. S. Lewis by Joe R. Christopher
 1989 – The Return of the Shadow by J. R. R. Tolkien, edited by Christopher Tolkien
 1990 – The Annotated Hobbit by J. R. R. Tolkien, edited by Douglas A. Anderson
 1991 – Jack: C. S. Lewis and His Times by George Sayer
 1992 – Word and Story in C. S. Lewis, edited by Peter J. Schakel and Charles A. Huttar
 1993 – Planets in Peril by David C. Downing
 1994 – J. R. R. Tolkien, A Descriptive Bibliography by Wayne G. Hammond with the assistance of Douglas A. Anderson
 1995 – C. S. Lewis in Context by Doris T. Myers
 1996 – J. R. R. Tolkien: Artist and Illustrator by Wayne G. Hammond and Christina Scull
 1997 – The Rhetoric of Vision: Essays on Charles Williams, ed. by Charles A. Huttar and Peter Schakel
 1998 – A Question of Time: J. R. R. Tolkien's Road to Faërie by Verlyn Flieger
 1999 – C. S. Lewis: A Companion and Guide by Walter Hooper
 2000 – Roverandom by J. R. R. Tolkien, edited by Christina Scull and Wayne G. Hammond
 2001 – J. R. R. Tolkien: Author of the Century by Tom Shippey
 2002 – Tolkien's Legendarium: Essays on The History of Middle-earth, edited by Verlyn Flieger and Carl F. Hostetter
 2003 – Beowulf and the Critics by J. R. R. Tolkien, edited by Michael D. C. Drout
 2004 – Tolkien and the Great War: The Threshold of Middle-earth by John Garth
 2005 – War and the Works of J.R.R. Tolkien by Janet Brennan Croft
 2006 – The Lord of the Rings: A Reader's Companion by Wayne G. Hammond and Christina Scull
 2007 – The J. R. R. Tolkien Companion and Guide by Wayne G. Hammond and Christina Scull
 2008 – The Company They Keep: C. S. Lewis and J. R. R. Tolkien as Writers in Community by Diana Glyer; appendix by David Bratman
 2009 – The History of the Hobbit by John D. Rateliff, Part One: Mr. Baggins; Part Two: Return to Bag-end
 2010 – Tolkien, Race, and Cultural History: From Fairies to Hobbits by Dimitra Fimi
 2011 – Planet Narnia by Michael Ward
 2012 – Tolkien and Wales by Carl Phelpstead
 2013 – Green Suns and Faërie: Essays on J.R.R. Tolkien by Verlyn Flieger
 2014 – Tolkien and the Study of His Sources: Critical Essays by Jason Fisher, ed.
 2015 – C. S. Lewis and the Middle Ages by Robert Boenig
 2016 – Charles Williams: The Third Inkling by Grevel Lindop
 2017 – The Fellowship: The Literary Lives of the Inklings: J.R.R. Tolkien, C. S. Lewis, Owen Barfield, Charles Williams by Philip Zaleski and Carol Zaleski
 2018 – The Inklings and King Arthur: J. R. R. Tolkien, Charles Williams, C. S. Lewis, and Owen Barfield on the Matter of Britain by Sørina Higgins, ed.
 2019 – There Would Always Be a Fairy Tale: More Essays on Tolkien by Verlyn Flieger
 2020 – “The Sweet and the Bitter”: Death and Dying in J.R.R. Tolkien's The Lord of the Rings by Amy Amendt-Raduege
 2021 – Tolkien’s Lost Chaucer by John M. Bowers
 2022 – Tolkien’s Modern Reading: Middle-earth Beyond the Middle Ages by Holly Ordway

Myth & Fantasy Studies 

Winners are listed below.
 1992 – The Victorian Fantasists, edited by Kath Filmer
 1993 – Strategies of Fantasy by Brian Attebery
 1994 – Twentieth-Century Fantasists, edited by Kath Filmer
 1995 – Old Tales and New Truths: Charting the Bright-Shadow World by James Roy King
 1996 – From the Beast to the Blonde by Marina Warner
 1997 – When Toys Come Alive by Lois Rostrow Kuznets
 1998 – The Encyclopedia of Fantasy, edited by John Clute and John Grant
 1999 – A Century of Welsh Myth in Children's Literature by Donna R. White
 2000 – Strange and Secret Peoples: Fairies and Victorian Consciousness by Carole G. Silver
 2001 – King Arthur in America by Alan Lupack and Barbara Tepa Lupack
 2002 – The Owl, the Raven & the Dove: The Religious Meaning of the Grimms' Magic Fairy Tales by G. Ronald Murphy
 2003 – Fairytale in the Ancient World by Graham Anderson
 2004 – The Myth of the American Superhero by John Shelton Lawrence and Robert Jewett
 2005 – Robin Hood: A Mythic Biography by Stephen Thomas Knight
 2006 – National Dreams: The Remaking of Fairy Tales in Nineteenth-Century England by Jennifer Schacker
 2007 – Gemstone of Paradise: The Holy Grail in Wolfram's Parzival by G. Ronald Murphy, S.J.
 2008 – The Shadow-Walkers: Jacob Grimm's Mythology of the Monstrous by Tom Shippey
 2009 – Four British Fantasists: Place and Culture in the Children's Fantasies of Penelope Lively, Alan Garner, Diana Wynne Jones, and Susan Cooper by Charles Butler
 2010 – One Earth, One People: The Mythopoeic Fantasy Series of Ursula K. Le Guin, Lloyd Alexander, Madeleine L'Engle and Orson Scott Card by Marek Oziewicz
 2011 – The Victorian Press and the Fairy Tale by Caroline Sumpter
 2012 – The Enchanted Screen by Jack Zipes
 2013 – Song of the Vikings: Snorri and the Making of Norse Myths by Nancy Marie Brown
 2014 – Tree of Salvation: Yggdrasil and the Cross in the North by G. Ronald Murphy
 2015 – Stories About Stories: Fantasy and the Remaking of Myth by Brian Attebery
 2016 – The Evolution of Modern Fantasy: From Antiquarianism to the Ballantine Adult Fantasy Series by Jamie Williamson
 2017 – Elf Queens and Holy Friars: Fairy Beliefs and the Medieval Church by Richard Firth Green
 2018 – Children's Fantasy Literature: An Introduction by Michael Levy and Farah Mendlesohn
 2019 – Celtic Myth in Contemporary Children's Fantasy: Idealization, Identity, Ideology by Dimitra Fimi
 2020 – A Modernist Fantasy: Modernism, Anarchism, and the Radical Fantastic by James Gifford
 2021 – Fantasies of Time and Death: Dunsany, Eddison, Tolkien by Anna Vaninskaya
 2022 – The Modern Myths: Adventures in the Machinery of the Popular Imagination by Philip Ball

References

External links
 Mythopoeic Awards Mythopoeic Society webpage about the Mythopoeic Awards
 Mythopoeic Awards top page in the Science Fiction Awards Database

American literary awards
Awards established in 1971
Fantasy awards
Mythopoeia
Tolkien studies
 Mythopoeic Awards